Charles Drinkwater was an American soccer outside left who played for Brooklyn Field Club in the 1914 National Challenge Cup championship game.

In 1906, Drinkwater played for the Gordon Rangers  By 1911, he is listed with Brooklyn Field Club in the National Association Football League.  On May 16, 1914, Brooklyn defeated Brooklyn Celtic to win the first National Challenge Cup.  On February 15, 1915, Drinkwater broke his collarbone while playing on loan with White Rose F.C. in a Metropolitan League game.

References

American soccer players
Brooklyn Field Club players
National Association Football League players
Association football forwards
Year of birth missing
Soccer players from Honolulu